The Rosebud Ranch is a historic ranch on the National Register of Historic Places located near Hood, California, south of Sacramento.

Built c. 1877 by William Johnston, the property reportedly stretched over two miles of the Sacramento River front and encompassed . Johnston used his property to grow vegetables, fruit, grain, as well as use for grazing and as a dairy farm.

In recent years the home has held public tours led by the Elk Grove Historical Society.

References

Italianate architecture in California
Buildings and structures completed in 1877
National Register of Historic Places in Sacramento County, California
1877 establishments in California